The anima loci or animus loci is the "soul" of a place, its essential personality. A concept linked to the supernatural spirits of nature as residing in stones, springs, mountains, islands, trees, etc.

Witchcraft
In witchcraft, the anima loci is often referred to a spirit of the place, sprite, fairy, guardian.

Sites with strong anima loci

References

External links 
A Guide to Local History Terminology

Tutelary deities